Jalan Ipoh is a major road in Kuala Lumpur, Malaysia. The road is named after the city of Ipoh in Perak. Its English name is called Ipoh Road.

History 

Jalan Ipoh obtained its name as the one and only road leading towards Ipoh from the city centre of Kuala Lumpur back then, part of the country's Federal Route 1. The road was formerly known as Batu Road. On the southeast end, the road used to extend to Chow Kit, forming a junction with Jalan Pahang, Jalan Raja Muda Abdul Aziz and Jalan Tuanku Abdul Rahman. On 26 November 2014, the Kuala Lumpur City Hall (DBKL) renamed the stretch from the Jalan Segambut junction to the Jalan Pahang junction of Jalan Ipoh to Jalan Sultan Azlan Shah.

List of junctions

References

Roads in Kuala Lumpur